Carle Clark Zimmerman (April 10, 1897 - February 7, 1983) was an American sociologist, and an inaugural member of Harvard University’s Department of Sociology.

Zimmerman's masterpiece was Family and Civilization. His work was not widely accepted in the discipline of sociology and is largely forgotten. Zimmerman's contribution to the field of sociology has been the stages of decline, corruption and social disintegration associated with the collapse of civilization. Zimmerman also showed that they appear in the family structure and what appearing in the family structure can mean.

Bibliography

 Marriage and the Family: A Text for Moderns, 1956 
 Family and Civilization (with Lucius F. Cervantes), 1947, A review of family structure throughout human history. 
 Rural Families on Relief (with Nathan Whetten), 1939 
 The Changing Community, 1938 
 Family and Society: A Study of the Sociology of Reconstruction (with Merle E. Frampton), 1937
 Consumption and Standards of Living, 1936 
 Siam Rural Economic Survey 1930-31, 1932, 
 Principles of Rural-Urban Sociology (1929, with Pitirim Sorokin) New York : H. Holt. Preface: "a summary of Source book in rural sociology," in three volumes, prepared under the auspices of the U.S. Dept. of Agriculture and the University of Minnesota, to be published in 1930 or 1931"

References

1897 births
1983 deaths
People from Cass County, Missouri
People from Winchester, Massachusetts
University of Missouri alumni
North Carolina State University alumni
University of Minnesota College of Liberal Arts alumni
Harvard University faculty
American sociologists